Toki may refer to:

People
 The Toki clan, a Japanese samurai clan
, Japanese decathlete
, Japanese sumo wrestler
 Palnatoki, a legendary Danish hero and chieftain
 Toki (also spelled Toqui), the title of a selected leader  of the Mapuche (indigenous Chilean people) during a time of war
Valmaine Toki, New Zealand barrister and solicitor

Places
Toki, Gifu, a city in Gifu prefecture, Japan
Toki, Subcarpathian Voivodeship, in south-east Poland
Toki, Masovian Voivodeship, in east-central Poland

Public institutions
TOKİ, Turkey's government-run public housing authority

Fictional characters
 Kamen Rider Tōki, a fictional character in Kamen Rider Hibiki
 Princess Toki, a character in Naruto
 Toki, the second of the four brothers of Hokuto Shinken in Fist of the North Star
 Toki, a character from Hayao Miyazaki's 1997 animated film Mononoke Hime
 Toki Fujiwara, a character in the anime Code:Breaker
 Toki Wartooth, the rhythm guitarist of the metal band Dethklok in Metalocalypse

Other
 Toki (train), the name of a train service in Japan
 Toki (video game), an arcade game, originally in Japan, featuring an eponymous enchanted ape as the main character
 Toki, the Japanese name of the Crested ibis
 Toki, shamans in the ancient Ryukyu Islands of Japan
 Toki, a brand of Japanese whisky produced by Beam Suntory
 Toki, a variety of Japanese apple
 Toki, the word for speech/language, and for hello in Toki Pona, a language created in 2001
 Toki, a company founded by Rob Monster creating servers to be distributed to Africa and Asia
 Toki, a prehistoric Māori adze

Japanese-language surnames